White Terror is the term used in Greece, analogous to similar cases, for the period of persecution of members of the Communist Party of Greece (KKE) and other former members of the leftist World War II-era resistance organization National Liberation Front (EAM) in 1945–46, prior to the outbreak of the Greek Civil War.

Background 
During the Axis occupation of Greece, the communist-dominated EAM-ELAS had become the major organization within the Greek Resistance movement. By the summer of 1944, with an estimated membership of between half and two million, and disposing of some 150,000 fighters, it dwarfed its nearest non-communist rivals, EDES and EKKA. Mounting tensions between itself and the other rival groups, sparked by ideology as well as EAM-ELAS' ambition to be the sole instrument of "national liberation", led to repeated clashes in 1943–44, in what was later termed the "first phase" of the Civil War. 

At the time of Greece's liberation in October 1944, EAM-ELAS dominated the country except for the major cities, especially Athens, where British forces supported the returned Greek government in exile. As from the return of the exiled government, a new  headed by Georgios Papandreou was established in Greece, with the participation of EAM and KKE, according to the Caserta Agreement. The internal disagreements of the government, resulted in the withdrawal of the EAM ministers. The dormant rivalry between the Papandreou's government, backed by the British, and EAM-ELAS, resulted in the Dekemvriana clashes in Athens (December 1944 – January 1945), where EAM-ELAS was defeated, and the disarmament of the organization in the Treaty of Varkiza (February 1945).

The Varkiza Agreement was never fully implemented as its terms contained many intentional omissions and ambiguities. The government side failed to fulfill its obligations, while rogue members of KKE such as Aris Velouchiotis hid large caches of weaponry in anticipation of future reprisals by the rightists.

White Terror and outbreak of the Civil War 
Greek leftists were systematically denied their political and legal rights by the government, facilitating their subsequent persecution. With EAM-ELAS neutralized, its members became easy prey for various right-wing groups in retaliation for the preceding "Red Terror". Thus, as Polymeris Voglis points out, "[w]hereas elsewhere in Europe prisons were flooded with fascists and their collaborators, in Greece most of the prisoners were members of leftist resistance organizations": according to the British Legal Mission in Greece, of the 16,700 prison inmates on 1 October 1945, 7,077 were common law criminals, 6,027 were left-wing prisoners imprisoned after the Dekemvriana, and only 2,896 were collaborators. As of December 1945, 48,956 people were wanted by the Greek authorities due to their affiliation with EAM-ELAS. The campaign of persecution lasted through 1945 and much of 1946, and was a critical element in the radicalization and polarization of the political climate in the country. 

By May 1945, the National Guard had established outposts across the entire country, however its numbers were insufficient to maintain order and the Gendarmerie's manpower was likewise depleted during the Dekemvriana. Under those circumstances policing was often carried out by far-right paramilitary organizations, most notably Organization X. In areas such as Crete, southern Peloponnese and Thessaly paramilitary bands outnumbered official security units even beyond 1946. While British involvement in directly supporting far-right paramilitaries remains a controversial issue in Greek historiography and has not been conclusively proven. It is certain that British authorities tolerated their activities and made no effort to prevent the persecution of Greek leftists. Following the Varkiza Agreement, 35 far-right death squads were formed in Central Greece, 35 in Thessaly, 23 in Epirus, 50 in the Peloponnese, 38 in Western Macedonia, a total of 35 bands operated in Central Macedonia, Eastern Macedonia and Thrace. Deaths squads also operated on various Greek islands, bringing the total number of paramilitaries to over 230 bands, which numbered 10,000 to 18,000 members in July 1945. After the second party congress of KKE in February 1946, approximately 250 leftist self-defense militias, known as Groups of Democratic Armed Persecuted Fighters (ODEKA), were formed across Greece, totaling some 3,000 men. Most of the militiamen were former ELAS fighters. The Left's boycott of the 1946 election, and finally the resumption of warfare with the outbreak of the third, or main phase, of the Greek Civil War in spring 1946.

In the period between the Treaty of Varkiza and the 1946 election, right-wing terror squads committed 1,289 murders, 165 rapes, 151 kidnappings and forced disappearances. 6,681 people were injured, 32,632 tortured, 84,939 arrested and 173 women were shaved bald. Following the victory of the United Alignment of Nationalists on 1 April 1946 and until 1 May of the same year, 116 leftists were murdered, 31 injured, 114 tortured, 4 buildings were set aflame and 7 political offices were ransacked.

See also 
 Makronisos
 Like Stone Lions at the Gateway into Night
 Internal exile in Greece

References

Sources 

 
 
 
 
 
 
 
 
 
 
 
 

1945 in Greece
1946 in Greece
Political and cultural purges
Anti-communism in Greece
Greek Civil War
Greece
Political repression in Greece